Better Times is the seventh studio album by Australian rock band The Black Sorrows. The album was released in September 1992 and peaked at number 13 on the ARIA Albums Chart, becoming the band's third consecutive top-twenty album.

In March 1993, the album was re-released with The Revelators' Amazing Stories. Upon re-release, the album peaked at number 14 on the ARIA Albums Chart.

At the ARIA Music Awards of 1993, the album earned The Black Sorrows a nomination for ARIA Award for Best Group, losing to "Weather with You" by Crowded House. Joe Camilleri was nominated for Producer of the Year for his work on this album, but lost to Simon Hussey.
Pascoe & Gray Design and Eryk Photography were nominated for Best Cover Art for their work on Better Times, but lost to Paul McNeil and Richard All.

Track listing
 "Better Times" (Joe Camilleri, Laurie Polec)
 "Come On, Come On" (Joe Camilleri, Laurie Polec)
 "Ain't Love the Strangest Thing" (Joe Camilleri, Laurie Polec)
 "A Night Like This" (Joe Camilleri, Laurie Polec)
 "Too Long Gone" (Joe Camilleri, Laurie Polec)
 "Stella" (Joe Camilleri, Laurie Polec)
 "Steps of Time" (Joe Camilleri)
 "Bitter Cup"(Joe Camilleri, Laurie Polec)
 "Sweet Inspiration" (Joe Camilleri, Laurie Polec)	
 "Storm Wind" (Joe Camilleri, Laurie Polec)
 "Resurrection" (Joe Camilleri, Laurie Polec)

Charts

References

External links
 "Better Times" at discogs.com

1992 albums
The Black Sorrows albums
CBS Records albums
Albums produced by Joe Camilleri